Sz'Kwa is a two-player abstract strategy game from Taiwan.  It is a go, weiqi, or baduk variant.  The Sz'Kwa board is not an n x n square board like go or weiqi.  Instead, the board is circular in design.  The same board is used by Watermelon Chess and one of the ancient Roman Bear games.

Goal 

To capture the most enemy pieces.

Equipment 

The board is composed of a large circle with an inner middle circle.  Four semicircles form a North, South, East, and West arrangement in the interior of the larger circle.  The large circle and the smaller middle circle are divided equally into four pie slices.  This creates for twenty-one intersection points where the pieces are played upon.

Each player has 20 pieces.  One plays the black pieces, and the other plays the white pieces, however, any two colors or distinguishable objects will do.

Game play 

The board is empty in the beginning.

Players decide what colors to play, and who starts first.  

Players drop one of their pieces on any vacant intersection point on the board.  Only one piece can be dropped per turn.  Players alternate their turns.

Enemy pieces can be captured as long as they are surrounded completely by the player's pieces.

The game ends when there are no more vacant intersection points to drop a piece onto, or when one player has exhausted all their pieces.

Related Games 

 Go/weiqi/baduk
 Watermelon Chess
 Bear games

External links 
 http://nrich.maths.org/public/viewer.php?obj_id=1196

Abstract strategy games
Taiwanese culture